Valentino Sala (October 8, 1908 in Morimondo – December 27, 2002) was an Italian professional football player and coach.

His younger brother Costantino Sala played in the Serie A for Ambrosiana-Inter in the 1930s. To distinguish them, Valentino was referred to as Sala I and Costantino as Sala II.

References

External links

1908 births
2002 deaths
Italian footballers
Serie A players
Serie B players
Inter Milan players
A.C. Monza players
Genoa C.F.C. players
Pisa S.C. players
Italian football managers
Genoa C.F.C. managers
Association football midfielders
A.C. Meda 1913 players
Vigevano Calcio players